The 1928 Washington & Jefferson Presidents football team was an American football team that represented Washington & Jefferson College as an independent during the 1928 college football season. The team compiled a 2–5–2 record and was outscored by a total of 117 to 67. Andrew Kerr was the head coach.

Schedule

References

Washington and Jefferson
Washington & Jefferson Presidents football seasons
Washington and Jefferson Presidents football